The  is the third largest of Japan's yakuza groups, with approximately 3,100 members. It is based in the Kantō region, and was one of the first yakuza organizations to begin operating overseas.

History

Most of its members were drawn from the bakuto (traditional gamblers), and illegal gambling has long been the clan's main source of income. It has also expanded into such fields as drug trafficking, blackmail, extortion, and prostitution.

The Inagawa-gumi was renamed the Inagawa-kai in 1972. After Kakuji Inagawa, the gang was led by Susumu Ishii, who led it to unprecedented financial prosperity during the 1980s Japanese bubble economy. At one point the clan's assets were estimated to be over $1.5 billion.  After Ishii's death in 1990, Inagawa's son Toi Inagawa took over as kumicho and led the clan until his death in May 2005.  Yoshio Tsunoda took up the mantle in 2006, heading the clan until his death in February 2010.  Kazuo Uchibori may be next in line to lead the clan, but his status as a kyodaibun (blood brother) to Takeuchi Teruaki, a senior member of the Yamaguchi-gumi, may complicate things.

February 2009 saw the Inagawa-kai 'Honbu' (Head Office) relocate from the Roppongi district of Tokyo to Akasaka.  There is currently strong resistance from the local political groups and residents of Akasaka meaning that the location of the new Honbu may change yet again.

The Inagawa-kai quietly helped to provide relief in the wake of the 2011 Tōhoku earthquake and tsunami by sending supplies to affected areas.  As a whole, the group shipped over 100 tons of supplies, including instant ramen, bean sprouts, paper diapers, batteries, flashlights, tea and drinking water, to the Tōhoku region.

Key persons
Inagawa-kai's renowned figures in the 20th century include Tatsuo Deguchi (known as the "Moroccan Tatsu" or "Tatsu of Morocco"), Kingo Yoshimizu, Kijin Inoue, Takamasa Ishii, Haruki Sho, and Kiichiro Hayashi.

Leadership
On April 7, 2019, Jiro Kiyota retired from kaicho and assumed the position of sosai, but remains the leader according to the National Police Agency.

 1st kaicho: Seijo Inagawa (real name: Kakuji Inagawa)
 2nd kaicho: Takamasa Ishii (real name: Susumu Ishii)
 3rd kaicho: Yūkō Inagawa (real name: Toi Inagawa)
 4th kaicho: Yoshio Tsunoda
 5th kaicho: Jiro Kiyota (Korean name: Shin Byong-Kyu, 신병규)
 6th kaicho: Kazuya Uchibori

In popular culture
 In the 2010 movie Predators, one of the main characters is a Yakuza enforcer known as Hanzo (played by Louis Ozawa Changchien) who is revealed to be a high ranking member of Inagawa-kai.
 In the popular tabletop role-playing game Shadowrun, the kaicho (boss/head/oyabun) of Inagawa-kai in the Shadowrun universe is Michizane Oi, a notorious Japanese elf and Yakuza gangster and son of a powerful executive, Samba Oi, the Chairman of the Board of Mitsuhama Computer Technologies (or MCT), one of the biggest Keiretsus in Japan.
 In Hitman 2: Silent Assassin, one of the characters, Tanaka Kusahana is a high-ranking member of Inagawa-kai (saiko-komon or senior advisor).

References

1949 establishments in Japan
Yakuza groups